Sabera is a genus of skippers in the family Hesperiidae.

Species
Sabera aruana (Plötz, 1886)
Sabera biaga Evans, 1949
Sabera caesina (Hewitson, [1866])
Sabera dobboe (Plötz, 1885)
Sabera dorena Evans, 1935
Sabera expansa Evans, 1935
Sabera fuliginosa (Miskin, 1889)
Sabera fusca Joicey & Talbot, 1917
Sabera iloda Parsons, 1989
Sabera kumpia Evans, 1949
Sabera madrella Parsons, 1986
Sabera metallica de Jong, 2008
Sabera misola Evans, 1949
Sabera tabla (Swinhoe, 1905)

References
Natural History Museum Lepidoptera genus database
Notes on some skippers of the Taractrocera-group (Lepidoptera: Hesperiidae: Hesperiinae) from New Guinea
Sabera at funet

Taractrocerini
Hesperiidae genera